Ognjen Stojanović (born 24 January 1990 in Novi Sad) is a Serbian triathlete.

Career
Stojanović, at an early age, was diagnosed with the bone disease Legg–Calvé–Perthes syndrome and as a results he had his hip operated on. Because this limited his mobility he began swimming. After competing in swimming for 11 years he got involved in triathlon in 2005. He started practicing all three sports and in 2006, after just one year in the sport, he became a national junior champion. In 2007 he won the National Senior Championship and European Junior Cup in Eilat later that year.

In 2008 Stojanović made 3 podiums on European junior cups and was later recognized by ITU Sport Development and participated on Australian Youth Olympic Festival in Sydney in January 2009 where he finished 13th individual and 4th in relays with ITU team. In the same year he became first ever Balkan senior champion in Olympic distance triathlon while he was still in junior category. In 2009, he took 4th place at the ITU Aquathlon World Championships. In 2011 he won Pan American continental cup in Cartagena, Colombia and took third at the ITU World Aquathlon Championships in Auckland in 2012.

Stojanović founded the Triogy Racing club in Serbia in 2013. That same year he began racing long-distance triathlon with Arenales 113 race in Elche, with the time of 3:44:55 where he finished 6th overall. Later he was 16th place on ETU European U23 Championships in Holten, Netherlands, and then 1st at the National Marathon Championships with overall win at Novosadski Maraton with the time of 2:46:29.

In 2014 Stojanović won both duathlon and triathlon ITU Balkan Championships and also qualified for the 2015 European Games in Baku, Azerbaijan. In 2015 At the European games he took 18th and won ETU Balkan Championship in Zagreb, Croatia.

2016. saw him taking silver medal at the ITU Asian Cup Taizhou in China, and win at the ETU Balkan Championships Olimp in Romania which is his 8th title. He finished 6th at Ironman 70.3 Budapest (pro category) and 3rd at Ironman 70.3 Pula (overall category; pro category was not held).

In 2017. Ognjen continued his domination in Balkan region with a 9th win at ETU Balkan Championships which was held in Bulgaria. In Taizhou in China on ITU Asian Cup he took bronze medal, and also won National 10 km road race in Kula, Serbia. At the end of the season he was 12th on World Cup Salinas in Ecuador.

In 2018. he won 10th Balkan Championships title.

2019 was great year for Ognjen as he won European Aquathlon Championhsips in Targu Mures in Romania. He also won 2 Continental cups and made podium on 6 Continental Cup races.

Notable accomplishments 
 European Aquathlon Champion 2019
 10 times Balkan Champion
 12 ITU Continental Cup podiums
 18th place European Games Baku 2015
 3rd place ITU Aquathlon World Championships 2012
 Multiple National Triathlon Champion
 National Champion and medalist on 5 km, 10 km, Half-Marathon and Marathon Championships

Personal
Stojanović finished mathematical high school, first year of applied mathematics at University of Novi Sad and has Master of Sports Coaching (MSc), Bachelor with honours (BSc hons) and Bachelor of Science (BSc) degrees at Faculty of Sport in Belgrade.

References

External links 

Living people
Serbian male triathletes
Sportspeople from Novi Sad
Triathletes at the 2015 European Games
European Games competitors for Serbia
1990 births